Azusa may refer to:

Relating to California
From a Native American language, likely Tongva Asuksagna:
Azusa, California, a city in the United States
Azusa Pacific University, a Christian-based institution in Azusa, California
Azusa Street Revival, a Christian movement that began in Los Angeles

Other uses
Azusa (given name)
Azusa (train), a limited express train service in Japan
Azusa (band), a metal band
Azusa, the Japanese cherry birch (Betula grossa)
Azusa Yumi, a bow made from the wood of the Japanese cherry birch
AZUSA, a radar interferometer
Azusa Nakano from the manga/anime K-On!